When I'm Gone may refer to:

Songs
 "When I'm Gone" (3 Doors Down song)
 "When I'm Gone" (Albert Hammond song)
"When I'm Gone" (Alesso and Katy Perry song)
 "When I'm Gone" (Eminem song)
 "When I'm Gone" (Motown song), written by Smokey Robinson and recorded by Brenda Holloway and by Mary Wells
 "When I'm Gone" (Simple Plan song)
 "When I'm Gone" (Carter Family song), written by A. P. Carter and recorded originally by the Carter Family, reworked by Anna Kendrick as "Cups"
 "When I'm Gone", by Before You Exit from All the Lights
 "When I'm Gone", by Bobby Darin, non-LP track
 "When I'm Gone", by The Click Five from Modern Minds and Pastimes
 "When I'm Gone", by Craig Morgan from A Whole Lot More to Me
 "When I'm Gone", by McAuley Schenker Group from M.S.G.
 "When I'm Gone", by Phil Ochs from Phil Ochs in Concert
 "When I'm Gone", by Randy Newman written for the TV series Monk
 "When I'm Gone", by The Staple Singers from Freedom Highway